Myonyssus is a genus of mites in the family Laelapidae.

Species
 Myonyssus decumanus Tiraboschi, 1904
 Myonyssus gigas Oudemans, 1912
 Myonyssus rossicus Bregetova, 1956
 Myonyssus ingricus Bregetova, 1956

References

Laelapidae